The Serbia and Montenegro Women's Handball Championship was the premier championship for women's handball clubs in FR Yugoslavia (between 1992 and 2003) and Serbia and Montenegro (between 2003 and 2006), before the split of the country. It succeeded Yugoslav Championship after 1992-1993 season. The last season was disputed in 2005-2006.

All the championships were won by ŽRK Budućnost Podgorica (14 tiles).

Today, the teams play in one of the following championships:
 Montenegrin First League
 Serbian First League

Winners

See also 

 Handball League of Serbia

References

Wom
Defunct women's handball leagues